Mojokerto Regency is a regency in East Java Province of Indonesia. It is part of the Surabaya metropolitan area (known as Gerbangkertosusila) which comprises Gresik Regency, Bangkalan Regency, Mojokerto Regency, Mojokerto City, Surabaya City, Sidoarjo Regency, and Lamongan Regency. The Regency covers an area of 692.15 sq. km (excluding the independent city of Mojokerto). The population of the Regency was 908,004 in 2000, but had risen to 1,025,443 at the 2010 Census and to 1,119,209 at the 2020 Census; the official estimate as at mid 2021 was 1,125,522. Many of them earn their living as small farmers and craftsmen (consisting shoemakers, furniture makers, and souvenir makers).

The administrative capital is the town of Mojosari.

Administrative Districts
The Regency is divided into eighteen districts (kecamatan), tabulated below with their areas and population totals from the 2010 Census and the 2020 Census, together with the official estimates as at mid 2021. The table also includes the number of administrative villages (rural desa and urban kelurahan) in each district, and its postal codes. 

The city of Mojokerto, which since 1999 has been administratively independent of the Regency (although the regency administration remains at present centred on the city), virtually divides the regency into two zones - the southern zone comprising the first 14 districts listed above, and the smaller northern zone, comprising the last 4 districts listed above.

Neighbouring regencies
 Northern boundary: Gresik and Lamongan
 Southern boundary: Malang
 Eastern boundary: Sidoarjo and Pasuruan
 Western boundary: Jombang

Mojokerto Regency's area is 692.15 km2, located between 15 m and 3,156 m above sea level. It is divided into northern and southern regions by the Brantas River. The southern region has several mountains, which includes Welirang Mountain (3,156 m), Anjasmoro Mountain (2,277 m) and Penanggungan Mountain (1693m).

One of the more famous locations in Mojokerto is Pacet, which has a good mountainous view.

Sleeping Buddha
The biggest Sleeping Buddha Statue in Indonesia is in Maha Vihara Mojopahit Bejijong, Trowulan District, Mojokerto Regency. The statue is 22 metres in length, 6 metres in width and 4.5 metres in height.

References

External links